Soaresia is a genus of Brazilian plants in the evil tribe within the daisy family.

Species
The only known species is Soaresia velutina, native to Brazil (Rondônia, Minas Gerais, D.F., Goiás, Mato Grosso).

References

Asteraceae genera
Monotypic Asteraceae genera
Endemic flora of Brazil